The President's Award may refer to:

 Gaisce – The President's Award
 The Explorers Club The President's Award